How to Rock is an American teen sitcom that ran on Nickelodeon from February 4 to December 8, 2012. It stars singer Cymphonique Miller, who previously sang the theme song for Nickelodeon's Winx Club. The series is based on the 2011 book, How to Rock Braces and Glasses by Meg Haston published by Little, Brown Books For Young Readers and Alloy Entertainment. The series was officially green-lit on May 23, 2011 with a 20-episode production order, later increased to 26. Two of the ordered episodes were merged into a special episode, so 25 episodes actually aired. The series began filming in August 2011. It is the first television sitcom to be produced by Alloy Entertainment.

It was confirmed by the series showrunner David M. Israel on August 26, 2012 that How to Rock would not be returning for a second season.

Premise
Kacey Simon (Cymphonique Miller) is a popular girl who was once mean, and whose status goes down after she must briefly wear braces and glasses. Ignored by her fellow mean girls, Kacey finds a new way to express herself through music by becoming the lead singer of the pop/hip-hop band, Gravity 4 with Stevie (Lulu Antariksa), Zander (Max Schneider), Nelson (Noah Crawford), and Kevin (Christopher O'Neal). The success of the band, now renamed Gravity 5, begins a rivalry with Kacey's former group The Perfs, a rival band featuring her former friends, and now archrivals, Molly (Samantha Boscarino) and Grace (Halston Sage).

Characters

Main
 Kacey Simon (Cymphonique Miller) is the former leader of the Perfs ("perf" is the abbreviation for "perfect") and the lead singer of Gravity 5. After getting glasses and braces, her social status takes a dive. Although she originally ridiculed the Gravity 5 band members, Zander convinces her to join. Kacey is confident, bold, self-centered, and now on a campaign to take her new friends and bandmates to the top of the school social ladder. With the help of her new friends, Kacey learns to look past appearances and accept herself and others as they are. Her and Molly's last names are references to 1960s singing duo Simon & Garfunkel.
 Molly Garfunkel (Samantha Boscarino) is the new leader of the Perfs and the antagonist of the series. Molly is competitive, popular, and a talented singer/dancer. She is Kacey's former best friend and it is implied that Kacey treated Molly badly when she was the leader of the Perfs. Molly is insecure and jealous of Kacey, and often tries to humiliate her and Gravity 5. Her best friend is Grace King, whose kindness serves as a counterpoint to Molly's snarky nature. Over the course of the series, she becomes kinder towards the Gravity 5 members, partly due to her crush on Zander and her reconciliation with Kacey.
 Zander Robbins (Max Schneider) is the new kid at Brewster High School who acts as the guitarist, keyboardist, and DJ for Gravity 5 as well as its leader. Zander is cool, handsome, and sometimes vain. A running gag in the show is that he can never stop staring at himself in the mirror or combing his hair. Because he is new, he is oblivious to the Perf's bullying behavior and is more inclined to believe the best in them. In the episode "How to Rock a High School Sensation," Zander is shown to have a crush on Molly. In "How to Rock a Yearbook," it is shown that Zander constantly takes bad yearbook pictures and has a younger sister.
 Stevie Baskara (Lulu Antariksa) is Gravity 5's smart, sarcastic, tough bass player. The Perfs always call her "Loserberry," much to her annoyance. She is a tomboy and has a number of unfeminine habits, including burping on command. She has four older brothers, and the only clothes she gets offered are sweatpants and sweat socks. Throughout the series, she works in food service at Danny Mango's and the school cafeteria. In addition to playing the bass, Stevie also plays the violin and the cello. Stevie was not featured in the 2011 novel.
 Grace King (Halston Sage) is Molly's gorgeous but naïve sidekick, as well as the second-in-command of the Perfs. Although she tries to emulate Molly's cruel attitude, Grace can never find it in herself to be mean to others. In "How to Rock Cee Lo," Grace temporarily leaves the Perfs due to Molly's mean attitude but later reconciles with Molly. She has a mutual crush on Nelson.
 Nelson Baxter (Noah Crawford) is the tech-savvy, sci-fi loving keyboard player for Gravity 5. He is also Kevin's best friend. Nelson gets socially awkward and tongue-tied around girls,. Nelson is the treasurer of the science club and has a love for video games. He has a mutual crush on Grace. Along with Kevin, he was briefly addicted to the video game Furious Pigeons, a parody of Angry Birds. In "How to Rock a Lunch Table," it is shown that Nelson still sleeps with his baby blanket, which he calls Captain Blankie. In "How to Rock a Birthday Party," Kacey and Nelson are revealed to have the same birthday and to have known each other since grade school.
 Kevin Reed (Christopher O'Neal) is the drummer for Gravity 5 and Nelson's best friend. He is obsessed with food and is socially awkward with the girls. He is athletic enough to join various sports teams, but too lazy to be a good player. He is demonstrated to be a terrible liar and a bit of a nervous wreck. He shares Nelson's love of video games and also loves to make and hear bad puns; he often gives Nelson a high-five when they hear one. He has a crush on Kacey, but also finds Molly attractive. In the episode "How to Rock an Election," Kevin is shown to be somewhat of a skilled rapper. In "How to Rock a Lunch Table," it is shown that he still sleeps with an old stuffed animal named "Mikey the Manatee."

Recurring
 Andy Bartlet (Jacob Houston) is an odd but well-meaning student who goes to Brewster High School. Most of the school sees him as a geek, but despite his quirks, the Gravity 5 members see him as a dependable friend. He tries to make friends but has many disgusting habits that turn others away from him. He is shown to like "Furious Pigeons" along with Nelson and Kevin, and he is impressed by Stevie's burping skills. In "How to Rock Cee Lo," he auditioned to be the new lead singer of Gravity 5.
 Mr. March (Kirk Fox) is the history teacher at Brewster High School. His catchphrase is "What's up?!" and he often tries to talk like a young person. He serves as a mentor for the Gravity 5 members. 
 Iverne (Fuschia J. Walker) is the ill-tempered school lunch lady of Brewster High School. She has an unrequited crush on Mr. March. The food she makes is often reviled by the students.
 Danny Mango (T.J. Miller) is the eccentric owner and namesake of Danny Mango's, a fruit smoothie store in the mall. He also works as a driving instructor. He is Stevie's boss, as well as Kacey's temporary boss in "How to Rock a Part-Time Job." He has a habit of referring to himself in the third person at all times.
 Dahlia (HaleyAnn Johnson) is a student who goes to Brewster High School. She has an obsessive crush on Zander. She served as a moderator of the Class President debate and works on the school newspaper.
 Mall Cop (Jason Sims-Prewitt) is the frustrated security guard at the mall where Stevie works. He is occasionally irritated by the antics of Gravity 5, especially Zander. He was also a Security Guard for Cee Lo Green at his concert.

Episodes

Music featured in each episode
 "Only You Can Be You" – Gravity 5 
 "Rules for Being Popular" – The Perfs 
 "I'll Be There" – Kacey Simon 
 "Go With Gravity" – Gravity 5 
 "Hey Now" – Gravity 5  
 "Good Life" – Gravity 5 
 "Music Sounds Better With U" – Big Time Rush 
 "Today's School News/You Want News, Babe" – Gravity 5 
 "Move With the Crowd" – Gravity 5 
 "Last 1 Standing" – Gravity 5 
 "War on the Dance Floor" – Kacey Simon 
 "How You Do It" – Gravity 5 
 "Lady" – Zander Robbins 
 "All About Tonight" – Kacey Simon 
 "Crazy" – Kacey and Cee Lo 
 "Rock with Me" – Gravity 5 
 "Just Do Me" – Gravity 5 
 "Me, Myself and I" – Gravity 5, The Perfs and Trey Grant 
 "Deck the Halls" – Gravity 5

Broadcast
The series began broadcasting on the Nickelodeon channels on February 4, 2012, in U.S.; July 23, 2012, in Canada; May 20, 2013, in UK and Ireland; and August 13, 2013 in Australia.

References

External links

 

2010s American comedy television series
2012 American television series debuts
2012 American television series endings
2010s Nickelodeon original programming
2010s American high school television series
American musical television series
2010s American teen sitcoms
English-language television shows
Television shows based on American novels
Television series by Alloy Entertainment
Television shows set in Los Angeles